Rise of the Saints, is a 2020 Nigerian action fantasy film directed by Samuel O. Olateru and produced by Bolanle Olasunde. The film stars Deyemi Okanlawon and Rachel Oniga in the lead roles whereas Tina Mba, Peter Fatomilola, and Teleola Kuponiyi  made supportive roles. The film deals with the story of Yoruba legend, Queen Moremi Ajasoro.

The film made its premier on 9 October 2020 in Filmhouse IMAX cinemas, Lekki after five years of its production. The film received mixed reviews from critics.

Cast
 Teleola Kuponiyi as Luke
 Deyemi Okanlawon as Wale
 Rachel Oniga as Aunty Tolu
 Tina Mba as Prophetess
 Peter Fatomilola as Orula
 Olufunmi Ronke Disu as Dena
 Daniel Ugbang

References

External links 
 

2020 films
English-language Nigerian films
Nigerian fantasy films
2020s English-language films